Patrick Galbraith and Jim Pugh were the defending champions, but Galbraith did not compete this year. Pugh teamed up with Brad Pearce and reached the semifinals before losing to Grant Connell and Scott Davis.

Wayne Ferreira and Michael Stich won the title by defeating Connell and Davis 7–6, 7–6 in the final.

Seeds

Draw

Draw

References

External links
 Official results archive (ATP)
 Official results archive (ITF)

Los Angeles Open (tennis)
1993 ATP Tour
Volvo Tennis Los Angeles
Volvo Tennis Los Angeles